Mount Harmer is an ice-covered peak,  high, in the north-central portion of Cook Island, in the South Sandwich Islands. It was charted in 1930 by Discovery Investigations personnel on the Discovery II, who named it for Sir Sidney F. Harmer, Vice-Chairman of the Discovery Committee.

References

Mountains and hills of South Georgia and the South Sandwich Islands